Estrella Galicia is a brand of pale lager beer, manufactured by the company Hijos de Rivera Brewery, and located in A Coruña, Galicia, Spain. 

The Estrella Galicia brewery was founded in 1906 by José María Rivera Corral when he returned to Galicia after travels in Cuba and Mexico. The firm remains 100 per cent family owned, with its founder's great grandson and namesake, José María Rivera and his partner Stuart Krenz, as company president.

Export markets for the company’s beer include the UK, Germany, Switzerland, Paraguay, Portugal, Brazil, Mexico, Spain and the United States. Annual production is approximately 200 million litres.

Types 

 Estrella Galicia Cerveza de Bodega (no pasteurization)
 Estrella Galicia Cerveza Especial
 Estrella Galicia Cerveza Especial Sin Gluten (no gluten)
 Estrella Galicia 0,0 (no alcohol)
 Estrella Galicia 0,0 NEGRA (no alcohol)
 Estrella Galicia 0,0 TOSTADA (no alcohol)
 La Estrella de Galicia
 Estrella del Camino
 Estrella de Navidad
 Fabrica de Cervezas (mixed with weird flavours)
 1906 Reserva Especial
 1906 Red Vintage
 1906 Black Coupage
 1906 Galician Irish Red Ale
 1906 de Bodega (no pasteurization)

Sponsorship
Estrella Galicia has sponsored Spanish Formula 1 driver Carlos Sainz Jr. since 2015, first at Toro Rosso in 2015-2017 and at Renault in 2018. Beginning in 2019, Estrella Galicia started sponsoring McLaren Racing in a multi-year deal. This deal came to an end in 2020. The brand also followed Sainz to Scuderia Ferrari, becoming an official partner for the 2021 season.

Estrella Galicia sponsors Celta de Vigo, Deportivo La Coruña, Lugo and Real Valladolid. The company also sponsored the well-known Netflix series  La Casa de Papel.

References

External links

Official website
1906
MEGA: Mundo Estrella Galicia

Beer in Spain
Spanish brands